Little Stretton may refer to:

Places

England
Stretton means "settlement on a Roman Road" (from the Old English stræt and tun).

Little Stretton, Leicestershire - a small village and parish
Little Stretton, Shropshire - a village and former parish